Justin Mincey (born March 5, 1986) is a former gridiron football player. He most recently played for the Iowa Barnstormers of the Arena Football League

References

External links 
 Florida State Seminoles bio

1986 births
Living people
American football defensive ends
Florida State Seminoles football players
Iowa Barnstormers players